The Sport Clube Lusitânia (commonly shortened to S.C. Lusitânia) is a sports club located in Angra do Heroísmo on the island of Terceira, in the Portuguese archipelago of the Azores.

History
In 1922, a group of enthusiastic footballers met in the Recreio dos Artistas, and founded the Sporting Clube Lusitânia, naming it for the airplane of the same name, used by Portuguese trans-Atlantic pioneers Gago Coutinho and Sacadura Cabral.
 
Their highest achievement is reaching the semifinals of the Taça de Portugal in 1964. They had defeated Ferroviário Lourenço Marques in the quarterfinals, the highest a Portuguese colony club ever reached in the Portuguese Cup (and only because the dictatorship of António de Oliveira Salazar allowed them to play as a means of demonstrating that Portugal's African possessions were provinces and not colonies).

The headquarters of the club is in the historic manorhouse of Dona Violante do Canto.

Current squad

Basketball team
The men's basketball team is part of the Portuguese Basketball League (LCB).

References

Football clubs in Portugal
Football clubs in the Azores
1922 establishments in Portugal
Football clubs in Terceira Island
Angra do Heroísmo
Sports clubs established in 1922